The white-cheeked nuthatch (Sitta leucopsis) is a species of bird in the family Sittidae. It is found in Afghanistan, Bhutan, India, Nepal, and Pakistan.

Its natural habitats are boreal forests and temperate forests.

Description 
It is 13 cm (5 in) long, white cheeks, chin, throat, and underparts, upper parts mostly dark grey.

References

External links 

 

white-cheeked nuthatch
Birds of Afghanistan
Birds of Pakistan
Birds of North India
Birds of Nepal
white-cheeked nuthatch
Taxonomy articles created by Polbot